Thiago Xavier Rodrigues Corrêa (born 27 December 1983) is a Brazilian professional footballer who plays as a defensive midfielder.

He formerly played for Botafogo and Cabofriense. In January 2007, he left for Ligue 2 side Châteauroux.

References

External links
 
 
 

Living people
1983 births
Footballers from Rio de Janeiro (city)
Association football midfielders
Brazilian footballers
Brazilian expatriate footballers
Ligue 2 players
Ligue 1 players
Botafogo de Futebol e Regatas players
LB Châteauroux players
ES Troyes AC players
Expatriate footballers in France
Associação Desportiva Cabofriense players
Valenciennes FC players
Brazilian expatriate sportspeople in France